Lin Chen-yi is an admiral of the Republic of China Navy in Taiwan. He was the Chief of the General Staff of the Republic of China Armed Forces between 2009 and 2013, and also the last senior admiral/general in the military after the new law that allows promotion to senior general/admiral rank only in wartime.

See also
 Executive Yuan
 Ministry of National Defense of the Republic of China
 Republic of China Armed Forces rank insignia

References

Republic of China Navy admirals
Living people
1945 births
Taiwanese people from Guizhou
Taiwanese Ministers of National Defense